Charles Hovey may refer to:

 Charles Edward Hovey (1827–1897), educator, college president and general in the U.S. Army
 Charles Fox Hovey (1807–1859), businessman in Boston, Massachusetts
 Charles Mason Hovey (1810–1887), American nurseryman, seed merchant, journalist and author
 Charles Hovey (naval officer) (1885–1911), U.S. Navy officer and manual writer